The Reformed Presbyterian Church of Scotland is a small, Scottish, Presbyterian church denomination. Theologically they are similar to many other Presbyterian denominations in that their office-bearers subscribe to the Westminster Confession of Faith. In practice, they are more theologically conservative than most Scottish Presbyterians and maintain a very traditional form of worship. In 1690, after the Revolution, Alexander Shields joined the Church of Scotland, and was received along with two other ministers. These had previously ministered to a group of dissenters of the United Societies at a time when unlicensed meetings were outlawed. Unlike these ministers, some Presbyterians did not join the reconstituted Church of Scotland. From these roots the Reformed Presbyterian Church of Scotland was formed. It grew until there were congregations in several countries. In 1876 the majority of Reformed Presbyterians, or RPs, joined the Free Church of Scotland, and thus the present-day church, which remained outside this union, is a continuing church.  There are currently Scottish RP congregations in Airdrie, Stranraer, Stornoway, Glasgow, and North Edinburgh. Internationally they form part of the Reformed Presbyterian Communion.

History

Overview

Chambers's Encyclopaedia describes the Cameronians being official designated, Reformed Presbyterians. It continues — no doubt, the principles of the body are those for which Cameron contended and died; but it assumed no distinct form till after the Revolution of 1688; and it might briefly be defined as consisting of a small party of Presbyterians, who objected to the Revolution settlement in church and state, and desired to see in full force that kind of civil and ecclesiastical polity that prevailed in Scotland from 1638 to 1649. According to the Solemn League and Covenant, ratified by the parliaments of England and Scotland, and also by the Assembly of Divines at Westminster in 1643, Presbyterianism was to be maintained in the kingdoms of England, Scotland, and Ireland, and popery, prelacy, superstition, heresies, schism, &c., were to be extirpated. The Covenanters in Scotland contended, as is well known, under much suffering, for this species of Presbyterian supremacy throughout the reigns of Charles II and James VII. As a measure of pacification at the Revolution, Presbytery was established in Scotland by act of parliament 1690; but it was of a modified kind. Substantially the church was rendered a creature of the state, more particularly as regards the calling of General Assemblies; and equally to the disgust of the extreme party whom we refer to, prelacy was not only confirmed in England and Ireland, but they saw that there was a general toleration of heresy — i. e., dissent. In sentiment, if not in form, therefore, this uncompromising party repudiated the government of William III and his successors, and still maintained the perpetually binding obligations of the Covenants. (For the historic view of other Scottish Presbyterians see Fentiman)
Unquestionably, these Cameronians acted under strong convictions, and only desired to carry out to a legitimate issue those principles which have always mingled with the theories of the Presbyterian Church of Scotland; but which, for prudential considerations, have been long practically in abeyance. In short, it is in the standards of this sect that we have to look for a true embodiment of the tenets held by the great body of English and Scotch Presbyterians of 1643. Others gave in to the Revolution settlement, and afterwards found cause to secede. The Cameronians never gave in, and of course, never seceded. 

Although thus, in point of fact, an elder sister of the existing Church of Scotland and all its Secessions, the Cameronian body, as has been said, did not assume a regular form till after the Revolution; and it was with some difficulty, amidst the general contentment of the nation, that it organised a communion with ordained ministers. The steadfastness of members was put to a severe trial by the defection of their ministers; and for a time, the people were as sheep without a shepherd. At 
length, after their faith and patience had been tried for 16 years, they were joined by the Rev. John M'Millan, from the Established Church, in 1706. 

In a short time afterwards, the communion was joined by Mr. John M'Neil, a licentiate of the Established Church. As a means of confirming the faith of members of the body, and of giving a public testimony of their principles, it was resolved to renew the Covenants; and this solemnity took place at Auchensach, near Douglas, in Lanarkshire, in 1712. The subsequent accession of the Rev. Mr. Nairne, enabled the Cameronians to constitute a presbytery at Braehead, in the parish of Carnwath, on 1 August 1743, under the appellation of the Reformed Presbytery. Other preachers afterwards attached themselves to the group, which continued to flourish obscurely in the west of Scotland and north of Ireland. For their history and tenets, we refer to the Testimony of the Reformed Presbyterian Church. 

Holding strictly to the Covenants, and in theory rejecting the Revolution settlement, the political position of the Cameronian is (says Chambers) very peculiar, as they refuse to recognise any laws or institutions which they conceive to be inimical to those of the kingdom of Christ; from which cause they have greatly isolated themselves from general society, and refused several of the responsibilities and privileges of citizens. At the same time, it is proper to say, that if zealous and uncompromising, 
they are also a peaceful body of Christians, who, under the shelter of a free and tolerant government, are left unmolested to renew the Covenants as often as fancy dictates. In 1860, the body numbered 6 presbyteries, comprising altogether 45 congregations in Scotland, one of which was in Edinburgh and 4 in Glasgow. Connected with the body, there are congregations in Ireland and North America.

Background

Reformed Presbyterians have been referred to historically as Covenanters because of their identification with public covenanting in Scotland, beginning in the 16th century. In response to the king's attempts to change the style of worship and form of government in the churches that had previously been agreed upon (covenanted) by the free assemblies and parliament, a number of ministers affirmed their adherence to those previous agreements. They became signatories to the "National Covenant" of February 1638 at Greyfriars Kirk, in Edinburgh. It is from this that the Blue Banner comes, proclaiming "For Christ's Crown And Covenant", as the Covenanters saw the king's attempt to alter the church as an attempt to claim its headship from Jesus Christ. In August, 1643, the Covenanters signed a political treaty with the English Parliamentarians, called the "Solemn League and Covenant". Under this covenant the signatories agreed to establish Presbyterianism as the national church in England and Ireland. In exchange, the "Covenanters" agreed to support the English Parliamentarians against Charles I of England in the English Civil War. The Solemn League and Covenant asserted the privileges of the "crown rights" of Jesus as king over both Church and state, and the Church's right to freedom from coercive state interference. Oliver Cromwell put the independents in power in England, signalling the end of the reforms promised by the Parliament.

The Presbyterians believed in the Divine Right of Presbytery. To this way of thinking the Presbyterian form of church government was not something granted by a king or civil government; it was a divine right. That is not to say that the church could over-rule the civil authorities in all things as in the Roman Catholic system; nor would they accept that the king had absolute powers conferred on him by God, despite what the Stuart kings asserted.  Rather the civil authorities and the church authorities each have their proper place - independently of each other. They had separate Magisteria. It is the doctrine of separation of Church and State as taught by John Calvin.

When the monarchy was restored in 1660, some Presbyterians were hopeful in the new covenanted king, as Charles II had sworn to the covenants in Scotland in 1650 and 1651. Charles II, however, determined that he would have none of this talk of covenants. While the majority of the population participated in the established church, the Covenanters dissented strongly; instead holding illegal worship services called conventicles in the countryside. They suffered greatly in the persecutions that followed, administered against them during the reigns of Charles II and James VII. Indeed the worst days of the period became known as the Killing Times. Meanwhile, when persecution broke out after Charles II had declared the Scottish Covenants illegal, tens of thousands of Scottish Covenanters had fled to Ulster, between 1660 and 1690. These Covenanters eventually formed the Reformed Presbyterian Church of Ireland.

The earlier martyrs in dying had protested that they not only feared God, but honoured the King; but in 1680, first in the Queensferry Paper, which was drawn up, it is supposed, by Donald Cargill, and afterwards in the Sanquhar Declaration, which was affixed to the Burgh Cross of that village by Richard Cameron, the authority of Charles II. was disowned, and war was declared against him as a tyrant and a usurper. The proclamation was an act of rebellion, but it will be remembered it was based on the same ground precisely as that which was taken up by William when he ascended the throne.

Split from Shields and the reconstituted Church of Scotland
In 1691, Presbyterianism was restored to the established Church in Scotland. Because there was no acknowledgement of the sovereignty of Christ in terms of the Solemn League and Covenant, however, a party of dissenters refused to enter into this national arrangement, the Revolution Settlement, on the grounds that it was forced upon the Church and did not adhere to the nation's previous covenanted settlement. These formed into societies which eventually formed the Reformed Presbyterian Church in Scotland.

In 1690, after the Revolution, Alexander Shields joined the Church of Scotland, and was received into communion, 25 October 1690, with his associates, Thomas Linning and William Boyd. These 3 had previously ministered to a group of dissenters of the United Societies when conventicles were outlawed. Unlike these ministers, some Presbyterians did not rejoin the establishment of the Church of Scotland. This left the "United Societies" without any minister for sixteen years. For those sixteen years the Dissenting Covenanters maintained their Societies for worship and religious correspondence. The Societies numbered about twenty, with a general membership of about seven thousand. Shields made his case for unity, and against schism, in the book An Enquiry into Church-Communion.

The idea of a Covenanted nation under a Presbyterian Covenanted king had taken firm possession of their minds of the Dissenters, and it produced a revulsion of feeling when, at the Revolution, no effort was made to bring back the vanished glory and re-instate the Covenant in its former supremacy. Instead of this, they found the newly constituted order was flagrantly at variance with the former and better, they could not acknowledge and submit to the one without rejecting the other; and so they resolved to maintain the same attitude toward the government of William as they had held toward that of the two preceding rulers. They would not own him as king, nor recognise his courts, nor pay the taxes imposed.

That men holding such views should keep aloof from the Revolution Church was to have been expected. The King took far too much to do with its organisation to allow of their adhering to it. Hence, when Presbyterianism was re-established, there remained outside a body of professing Christians who never seceded from this later Church of Scotland, because they never became members of it.

First ministers and synod

At the end of the sixteen years, in 1706, Rev. John M'Millan, minister of the parish of Balmaghie, who had tried to persuade his fellow presbyters and churchmen to return to the Covenant ground that they had abandoned, and who had suffered deposition for his persistency, was offered, and accepted, the office of minister to the Dissenting Societies.

The early history of this remarkable communion is very curious and interesting. For many years it had no ministry; yet it maintained a vigorous life by means of local "Societies" and a "General Meeting." By and by an Established Church minister — Mr. M'Millan of Balmaghie — joined them; but for more than a generation he was left to superintend the work alone.

Thomas Boston was very critical of what he called "the two preachers of the separation", being MacMillan and MacNeill. He preached a sermon in Ettrick on the subject of The Evil and Danger of Schism on 12 December 1708 which was aimed at what he saw to be their errors.  Vogan gives a summary of the doctrines in the sermon. Mr. Macneill was licensed by the Presbytery of Penpont, 10 May 1669. He was in the fullest sympathy with Macmillan, and joined him in his "Protestation, Declinature, and Appeal," tabled before the Assembly 1708. The United Societies consistently refused to ordain him, no Presbytery having been constituted, and when he died, 10 December 1732, he had been a probationer for sixty-three years.  MacMillan and the United Societies could not ordain their own ministers because in their own eyes they lacked the authority; they did not claim to be a separate church.

MacPherson says of Boston's sermon: "I am not sure but it is one which Renwick, had he survived so long, would have been quite prepared to preach. There was certainly an excuse, perhaps also a justification for Renwick's position which the later Cameronians could not plead for theirs."

MacPherson also discusses one of Hutchison's footnotes about the book Informatory Vindication which was written by Renwick and Shields before the Revolution. "In the course of his analysis of the Informatory Vindication, the Rev. Mr. Hutchison refers to the charge brought against its compilers of being schismatics, a charge, he says, they were well able to repel. They, he goes on to remark, still regarded themselves as a part of the historic Church of Scotland, and were wont to speak of it as the poor, torn, and bleeding mother . . . . They claim that they have not left the church . . . . The declining and corrupt part has left them; they are separating only as refusing to follow in this evil course . . . . They did not claim to be a church, but only fellowship societies of private Christians meeting together for mutual edification and strengthening, and having no idea of forming a separate church."

An attempt made to induce Ebenezer Erskine to join with the United Societies when he seceded from the Established Church in 1733 was not successful. On 1 August 1743, another minister, the Rev. Thomas Nairne, who had left the established Church of Scotland and joined the Associate Presbytery, came over to the Societies, which were then constituted as the Reformed Presbytery. Mr. Nairn came from Abbotshall in Fife who had been a Secession minister. The Presbytery was constituted at Braehead, Carnwath, and ordained new ministers, one of whom, John Cuthbertson, was despatched to support the cause in Pennsylvania. Alexander Marshall who had already studied theology was also ordained and subsequently called.

There was a breach in the Reformed Presbytery in 1753 following the publication of the book A Treatise on Justifying Faith by James Fraser of Brea, who had written it while a prisoner on the Bass Rock, and who had died in 1699. The Amyraldian view of the atonement was commended by a number of ministers who for a while continued as groups of worshipers. Some set up their own dissentient Presbytery which eventually declined out of existence; others morphed, over many years, and became, in 1813, The Unitarian Church of Edinburgh. The Reformed Presbytery had put out a publication teaching against Unitarianism in 1793 called A Testimony and Warning against Socinian and Unitarian errors. It was an official publication addressed to "Christians of every denomination" and was written by Archibald Mason, the first minister of the RP church in Wishaw. Mason later received an honorary D.D. from the college of Schenectady.

Losing two out of the five ministers made things difficult but did not prove fatal for the denomination. There were other splits or divisions in 1822, 1859, 1863 and 1876 despite some press articles claiming there have been none.

On 1 March 1763, an agreement was reached and the Church was divided into a Northern and a Southern congregation. The church increased in numbers, and in 1810 the Presbytery was divided into three—the Eastern, Northern, and Southern Presbyteries—which met the following year as the first Synod of the Reformed Presbyterian Church of Scotland. In that same year, the Irish and North American Reformed Presbyterian churches, daughters of the Scottish church, were also strong enough for each to constitute its first Synod.

The denomination's early views complexioned its whole after-position, and up till 1863 it was regarded in it as an excommunicable offence to take the oath of allegiance or to vote in an election. In that year, however, more liberal principles prevailed, and by a majority of four to one the Synod agreed to enact that "while recommending the members of the Church to abstain from the use of the franchise and from taking the oath of allegiance, discipline to the effect of suspension and expulsion from the Church shall cease."

The disruption of 1863
In 1863 the church had a constituency of over 10,000 people.
In accordance with its views of an un-covenanted Mornarchy it is, by the formal Act of Testimony, forbidden to the members to take the oath of allegiance or to exercise the franchise in elections for Parliament, because the persons so elected have themselves to take that oath. This prohibition had by the mid-19th century  been frequently disregarded, though while some kirk-sessions had at times suspended or cut off offenders, the presbytery or synod had never upon appeal confirmed the sentence; but upon the rise of the Volunteer movement in 1860 the question of the oath assumed fresh prominence. Some sessions attempted to prevent their kirk members from becoming volunteers; the case was thereupon referred to the synod in 1862, which, in 1863 enacted by a large majority, in accordance with previous practice, that, "while recommending the members of the Church to abstain from the use of the franchise and from taking the oath of allegiance, discipline to the effect of suspension and expulsion from the Church shall cease." Three ministers and eight elders, however, immediately protested against this formal abandonment, as they regarded it, of fundamental principles, withdrew from the synod, and formed another body under the same name, which has since then somewhat increased in numbers. There were therefore by 1874 two distinct bodies in Scotland bearing the same name of "Reformed Presbyterians".  The larger body (known now as the "Majority Synod") numbered forty-five congregations and maintained six missionaries in the New Hebrides; the smaller (known as the "Minority Synod" being the secession of 1863) had eleven congregations. At the census in 1851 the united body had thirty-nine places of worship. Branches of the Reformed Presbytery were found in Ireland and in the United States, and in both of these branches divisions took place earlier than in Scotland, on the same general grounds of modification of administrative rules and the application of fundamental principles to the varying circumstances of the times. Consequently the two Scottish bodies found themselves supported alike in their later controversy by distinct Irish and American synods. The larger body in Ireland had about thirty-three congregations, with a branch presbytery in New Brunswick and Nova Scotia, and the smaller had seven congregations. 

Subsequently the Majority Synod of around 10,000 were largely absorbed in a union with the Free Church of over 300,000 whereas today's RP church is the continuing church of the Minority Synod.

The union of 1876

In the May following — that of 1864 — an invitation came to the Majority Synod from the Joint Union Committee of the Free and United Presbyterian Churches, inviting it to take part in the negotiations which were then proceeding. This invitation was cordially accepted, A delegation, with Dr. Goold at its head, was appointed to confer with the other Churches, and in the meetings which were subsequently held, the Reformed Presbyterians took a notable part.

The adjusting of the terms of incorporation did not turn out to be difficult. All parties concerned were found to be very much of one mind in regard to the Second Reformation, the Revolution Settlement, and the Headship of Christ; and on 25 May 1876 the union was consummated. Only one minister in the Reformed Presbyterian clergy refused to go along with his brethren, so that the amalgamation was about as complete (says Walker) as it was possible to be. Five congregations refused to go into the union. Of these four rejoined the Minority Synod from the Disruption of 1863.

Since that time the Reformed Presbyterian Church in Scotland has continued from the Minority Synod. One hundred years after the Disruption of 1863 numbers had declined and there were down to 5 congregations and 5 ministers with membership in the 5 hundreds.  Numbers declined even more in the next few years. Today, there are still 5 congregations with some additional ministers coming in from outside the denomination; RP numbers increased when the Free Church changed its practise on psalm singing in worship. The denomination still maintains strong ties with the Reformed Presbyterian churches in Ireland and America.

Current congregations

Foreign missions

France 
The Scottish Church has a direct input into the mission work in Nantes, France via a mission committee which operates under the oversight of the Irish and Scottish RP Churches.

Sudan and Cyprus 
The RPCS takes an active interest in these mission works operated under the oversight of the RP Church in North America.

Names and nick-names

The Old Presbyterian Dissenters have assumed, and received, the appellation of Dissenters, on account of the part which their forefathers acted at the revolution, in 1689, while they openly and candidly dissented from the public deeds of the nation's representatives, in both church and state; considering these deeds as involving a mournful departure from former laudable attainments. The epithet Old has ordinarily been prefixed, to signify that they are of longer standing, as a distinct Body, than any other denomination of Presbyterians who have separated from the Established Church. In some parts of the country, especially in Ireland, they have been called Covenanters, because of their avowed attachment to the National Covenant of Scotland, and the Solemn League and Covenant of the three kingdoms.

Various nick-names are frequently given to them by others. They have been called Whigs — a term which, it is well known, has often been applied to the zealous friends of civil or religious liberty. Cameronians — from the Rev. Richard Cameron, who was killed at Airsmoss, in Kyle, on 20 July 1680. Mountain-men — on account of their adhering to the same cause with those who supported and countenanced the faithful preaching of the Gospel on the mountains and moors of Scotland during the persecution ; and because they themselves, in want of better conveniency, have often been obliged, even since the revolution, to administer ordinances in the open fields, though this is not so much the case now as it once was. M'Millanites — from the name of the first minister who espoused their cause after the revolution. Were the intention of the imposer good, (say the Synod) all these nick-names might be considered as very harmless.

They may also be called the Reformed, or Reformation Presbytery; while, in another point of view, they might, with equal propriety, be denominated the Dissenting Presbytery.

See also
 Presbyterianism
 Calvinism
 Cameronians
 Covenanters
 Solemn League and Covenant
 Free Church of Scotland (Continuing)

References

Citations

Sources

External links
Official site

Reformed Presbyterian Church (denominational group)
1690 establishments in Scotland
Religious organizations established in the 1690s
Protestant denominations established in the 17th century
Presbyterianism in Scotland
Religious organisations based in Scotland
Presbyterian denominations in Scotland